Sensitive skin is a skin condition in which skin is prone to itching and irritation.

Sensitive skin or Sensitive Skin may also refer to:

 Sensitive skin (electronic device)
 Sensitive Skin Magazine
 Sensitive Skin (UK TV series), a 2005–07 television series on BBC Two
 Sensitive Skin (Canadian TV series), a 2014 Canadian television adaptation of the British series